"Hostiles and Calamities" is the eleventh episode of the seventh season of the post-apocalyptic horror television series The Walking Dead, which aired on AMC on February 26, 2017. The episode was written by David Leslie Johnson and directed by Kari Skogland.

The episode focuses on Eugene's (Josh McDermitt) experience and discovery that he must navigate the mysterious, confusing, and terrifying world within the Sanctuary where he unwillingly begins to work for Negan (Jeffrey Dean Morgan). Concurrently, Dwight (Austin Amelio) pays a visit to a place from his past.

Plot
As Negan and his men are returning from Alexandria, Dwight discovers that Daryl has escaped, and finds the anonymous note Daryl was passed in his cell. When Negan arrives, he has Dwight beaten up and put in Daryl's cell. Negan informs Dwight that Sherry has run away and wonders if she was responsible for Daryl's escape, but he defends her, leading Negan to question Dwight's own loyalty. He orders Dwight to find and bring back Sherry. After being mended by Dr. Emmett Carson, Dwight leaves for his and Sherry's home before the apocalypse, having planned long ago to use it as a rendezvous should they get separated. There, he finds a farewell note from Sherry, admitting to helping Daryl to escape, and telling Dwight he's become a different person. Dwight returns to Sanctuary, bitter.

Meanwhile, Negan allows Eugene to settle into Sanctuary, being granted several amenities and privileges. When Negan asks him about his credentials, Eugene falls back on his old lies that he has multiple PhDs in biochemistry as well as immunology and microbiology. He also lies about being a member of a ten-person team at the Human Genome Project to fight weaponized diseases. Negan takes a liking to him, and allows him to spend time with a few of his "wives": Tanya, Frankie, and Amber. The women bond with Eugene. Later, Tanya and Frankie approach Eugene about making two poison capsules, explaining that Amber wants to commit suicide; Eugene reluctantly agrees. He finds that he has a position of power as he is able to cut in line and readily request the needed cold capsules to make the pills from the Savior marketplace, and finishes making the pills.

Negan brings Eugene along to the factory floor as he accuses Dr. Carson of allowing Daryl to go free. Dr. Carson refutes this, but Negan shows him a note they found in his office admitting to this, which Dwight had secretly cut from Sherry's letter and planted there. Dr. Carson attempts to blame Dwight, but Dwight remains steadfast. Negan prepares to brand Dr. Carson with a hot iron, but Dr. Carson relents and admits to letting Daryl go. As punishment, Negan throws Dr. Carson into the furnace, burning him to death.

Back in his apartment, Eugene tells Tanya and Frankie that he knows the pills are for Negan, not Amber, and refuses to turn them over; they angrily leave. Negan later arrives and prepares to ask Eugene a question, but Eugene quickly responds "I'm Negan", pledging his allegiance to the Saviors. The next day, Eugene is overseeing defense preparations outside Sanctuary.

Reception

Critical reception
"Hostiles and Calamities" received positive reviews from critics, with several critics praising Austin Amelio's performance as Dwight. On Rotten Tomatoes, it holds an 84% with an average rating of 6.96 out of 10, based on 31 reviews. The site's consensus reads: "While it may slow the season's pace, "Hostiles and Calamities" takes a tense look inside previously unexplored Savior lives, advancing one character's logical and much-needed moral transformation."

Zack Handlen of The A.V. Club gave the episode a B. He called it a solid episode devoted to Eugene and his journey toward the "dark side," writing, "Whether or not that journey was entirely necessary is a question we can save for some other time; for now, it’s nice to have a story with a clear beginning, middle, and end, one that finds a character making an unexpected (and yet entirely plausible) choice."

Ratings
The episode received a 4.9 rating in the key 18-49 demographic with 10.42 million total viewers.

References

External links

"Hostiles and Calamities" at AMC

2017 American television episodes
The Walking Dead (season 7) episodes
Television episodes directed by Kari Skogland